To Kingdom Come may refer to:

 To Kingdom Come: The Definitive Collection, a 1989 anthology album by The Band
 "To Kingdom Come", a 1968 song by The Band from Music from Big Pink
 "To Kingdom Come" (song), a 2008 song by Passion Pit
 "To Kingdom Come", an episode from the animated series Dragon Tales

See also 
 Kingdom Come (disambiguation)
 Til Kingdom Come (disambiguation)